In cryptography, the Rabin signature algorithm is a method of digital signature originally proposed by Michael O. Rabin in 1978.

The Rabin signature algorithm was one of the first digital signature schemes proposed.  By introducing the use of hashing as an essential step in signing, it was the first design to meet what is now the modern standard of security against forgery, existential unforgeability under chosen-message attack, assuming suitably scaled parameters.

Rabin signatures resemble RSA signatures with 'exponent ', but this leads to qualitative differences that enable more efficient implementation and a security guarantee relative to the difficulty of integer factorization, which has not been proven for RSA.
However, Rabin signatures have seen relatively little use or standardization outside IEEE P1363 in comparison to RSA signature schemes such as RSASSA-PKCS1-v1_5 and RSASSA-PSS.

Definition 
The Rabin signature scheme is parametrized by a randomized hash function  of a message  and -bit randomization string .

 Public key
 Signature
 A signature on a message  is a pair  of a -bit string  and an integer  such that 
 Private key
To make a signature on a message , the signer picks a -bit string  uniformly at random, and computes . If  is a quadratic nonresidue modulo , then the signer throws away  and tries again. Otherwise, the signer computes  using a standard algorithm for computing square roots modulo a prime—picking  makes it easiest. Square roots are not unique, and different variants of the signature scheme make different choices of square root; in any case, the signer must ensure not to reveal two different roots for the same hash . The signer finally reveals .

For example, in the simple case where ,  is simply a square root of  modulo .

Security 
Security against any adversary defined generically in terms of a hash function  (i.e., security in the random oracle model) follows from the difficulty of factoring :

Randomization of the hash function was introduced to allow the signer to find a quadratic residue, but randomized hashing for signatures later became relevant in its own right for tighter security theorems and resilience to collision attacks on fixed hash functions.

Variants 
The quantity  in the public key adds no security, since any algorithm to solve congruences  for  given  and  can be trivially used as a subroutine in an algorithm to compute square roots modulo  and vice versa, so implementations can safely set  for simplicity;  was discarded altogether in treatments after the initial proposal.

which allows the signer to create a signature in a single trial without sacrificing security.
This variant is known as Rabin–Williams.
Further variants allow tradeoffs between signature size and verification speed, partial message recovery, signature compression, and public key compression.

Variants without the hash function have been published in textbooks, crediting Rabin for exponent 2 but not for the use of a hash function.

By convention, when wishing to sign a given message, [the signer]  adds as suffix a word  of an agreed upon length .
The signer now compresses  by a hashing function to a word , so that as a binary number …

This notation has led to some confusion among some authors later who ignored the  part and misunderstood  to mean multiplication, giving the misapprehension of a trivially broken signature scheme.

References

External links 
Rabin–Williams signatures at cr.yp.to

Digital signature schemes